Madhuca borneensis is a plant in the family Sapotaceae.

Description
The bark is greyish. Inflorescences bear up to seven white flowers.

Distribution and habitat
Madhuca borneensis is endemic to Borneo. Its habitat is lowland mixed dipterocarp forest to  altitude.

Conservation
Madhuca borneensis has been assessed as near threatened on the IUCN Red List. The species is threatened by logging and land conversion for palm oil plantations.

References

borneensis
Endemic flora of Borneo
Trees of Borneo
Plants described in 1960